I Am a Man, also known as Yoo Jae-suk's I am a Man, is a South Korean talk show. Its initial (pilot episode) aired on 7 April 2014. The show's regular broadcast started on 8 August 2014, and ended on 19 December 2014.

The program airs on two channels, KBS2 and KBS World; the latter broadcasts the episodes several days after the former. As of 10 January 2015, there have been 20 episodes aired in KBS2 and 20 episodes on KBS World. The show is hosted by Yoo Jae-suk, Im Won-hee, Kwon Oh-joong, Jang Dong-min, and Heo Kyung-hwan. I Am a Man is intended largely for the male audience; female viewers are "welcome to watch it in secret."

I Am a Mans show theme is a show of men, by the men, for the men.

Broadcast datesNote: 
 As of November 2014, some of the KBS World program schedule information may become outdated due to the new program line-up.
 The broadcast time is based on GMT +9 time zone (Korea, Japan, East Timor, Palau).

 Hosts 
 Yoo Jae-suk
 Im Won-hee
 Kwon Oh-joong
 Jang Dong-min
 Heo Kyung-hwan
 Kim Je-dong (Regular member of I Am a Man Special – Man and women special)

Noh Hong-chul was offered to host the show, but had to be replaced by Kwon Oh-joong as he was unavailable due to the show's schedule conflict with another program he hosts, MBC's I Live Alone. He only appear on I Am a Man pilot episode.

 History
I Am a Man replaced Mamma Mia, a family show taken off air after its final episode on 19 March 2014.

One of I Am a Man's original hosts, Noh Hong-chul, was replaced by Kwon Oh-joong as his other show which he is now starring in, MBC's I Live Alone, occupied the same time slot.

TenAsia conducted an interview with I Am a Man's production director (PD) after the filming of I Am a Woman

I Am a Man aired its last episode on 19 December 2014. I Am a Man PD still discuss on extend this show to Season 2.

It was reported that KBS2's new program, Brave Family will take over the broadcast slot of I Am a Man before the show begins its second season.

Filming location
I Am a Man's filming location is the KBS Annex Building located in Yeouido-dong, Seoul. The show is typically recorded on Sunday and aired on Friday.

Pilot episode
The pilot episode of I Am a Man premiered on 9 April 2014 on KBS2, followed by its 7 May 2014 release on KBS World to estimate the show's potential audience. The pilot episode featured Bae Suzy and Koh Yu-Jin as special guests.

The pilot episode was preceded by a teaser trailer which introduced the hosts and presented the scope of the show.

The AGB Nielsen rating for the pilot episode was 4.1%.

Regular show
The show was included in the KBS2 program lineup and began airing regularly on 8 August 2014 on KBS2, and on 27 August 2014 on KBS World.

I Am a Woman special
I Am a Woman was recorded on 12 October 2014 and subsequently broadcast on 17 October 2014 on KBS2, and on 7 November 2014 on KBS World. The director of I Am a Man, PD Lee Dong Hoon, supervised the production of the I Am a Woman special. The show featured an audience of a hundred women who offered feedback on the I Am a Man show from a feminine perspective. The show reused four discussion topics from the previous I Am a Man episodes.

The special guests/performer for this special show was BEAST, a South Korean dance music group.

 List of I Am a Man episodes 

 Plot 

 Ratings  

All ratings are from the original episode broadcast on KBS2. ratings denote the highest numbers the series has garnered. ratings denote the lowest numbers the series has garnered.
(-) denotes that episode has not yet been aired in that channel Note:' Future broadcast dates are subject to change.

Notes

References

External links
 
I Am a Man KBS World playlist at YouTube

2014 South Korean television series debuts
Korean-language television shows
South Korean television talk shows
South Korean variety television shows